Rose Hill Cemetery is a cemetery located in Rose Hill, Oxford, England. It was opened in 1889 and has more than 20,000 burials. The cemetery is closed to new burials.  

The cemetery contains 28 Commonwealth graves from World War I, and 58 from World War II. 

Edward Brooks (1883–1944), recipient of the Victoria Cross in World War I, is buried in Rose Hill.

References

External links
 

Buildings and structures in Oxford
Cemeteries in Oxford
1889 establishments in England